(also written 2017 MZ8) is a near-Earth object and a potentially hazardous asteroid, meaning that it has an orbit that can make close approaches to the Earth and large enough to cause significant regional damage in the event of impact. It is an Apollo asteroid, meaning that it is an Earth-crossing asteroid that has an orbit larger than the orbit of the Earth. It was first observed on 22 June 2017, when the asteroid was about 1 AU from Earth and had a solar elongation of 131 degrees.

This asteroid is a lost asteroid. It has a short observation arc of 1.1 days and has not been seen since 2017, so it has an orbit that is only roughly calculated.

This asteroid is in both the Risk List of the European Space Agency (ESA) – Space Situational Awareness (SSA) and in the Sentry List of the Jet Propulsion Laboratory (JPL) - Center for Near Earth Object Studies (CNEOS). According to the Sentry List, of the possible close encounters with Earth in the foreseeable future, an encounter on 19 October 2020 has the highest Palermo Technical Impact Hazard Scale value.

According to the Near Earth Objects Dynamic Site (NEODyS), of the possible close encounters with Earth in the foreseeable future, an encounter on 20 November 2030 is the most likely. This encounter has a minimum possible distance of zero, meaning that an impact onto Earth is possible.

See also

References

External links 
 
 
 

Minor planet object articles (unnumbered)

Lost minor planets
Potentially hazardous asteroids
Potential impact events caused by near-Earth objects
20170622